Henry de Sully (or Henry de Soilli) (d. 23 or 24 October 1195) was a medieval monk, Bishop of Worcester and Abbot of Glastonbury.

Henry became prior of Bermondsey Abbey in 1186. In September 1189, following the death of Henry II of England, Richard I of England appointed him Abbot of Glastonbury. It was while he was abbot that Glastonbury claimed to find the body of King Arthur around 1191. He was elected to the see of Worcester on 4 December 1193 and consecrated on 12 December 1193. He died on 23 or 24 October 1195.

Citations

References
 British History Online Bishops of Worcester accessed on 3 November 2007
 

Bishops of Worcester
Abbots of Glastonbury
1195 deaths
12th-century English Roman Catholic bishops
Year of birth unknown